The B&L Transport 170 was a NASCAR Xfinity Series race that was held at Mid-Ohio Sports Car Course in Lexington, Ohio, United States. However, the race was extended by four laps due to a green–white–checker finish. In 2015, the race was reduced to 75 laps (169.35 miles).

The 2016 race saw the fourth time the Xfinity Series used rain tires in a points event; the previous times were Road America in 2014 and Montreal in 2008 and 2009.

In 2022, Mid-Ohio was taken off the Xfinity series schedule, in exchange for Portland International Raceway. The track was then given a NASCAR Camping World Truck Series race.

Race results

2013 & 2021: Races extended due to NASCAR overtime.
2020: Race cancelled and moved to Talladega due to the COVID-19 pandemic.

Multiple winners (drivers)

Multiple winners (teams)

Manufacturer wins

References

External links
 

2013 establishments in Ohio
NASCAR Xfinity Series races
NASCAR races at Mid-Ohio Sports Car Course
Recurring sporting events established in 2013
Annual sporting events in the United States